Bazelevo is a rural locality (a village) in Dedovsky Selsoviet, Fyodorovsky District, Bashkortostan, Russia. The population was 1 as of 2010. There is 1 street.

Geography 
Bazelevo is located 20 km southwest of Fyodorovka (the district's administrative centre) by road. Izhbulyak is the nearest rural locality.

References 

Rural localities in Fyodorovsky District